El Balcó del Pirineu (Pyrenees Balcony in English) is a residential area in Montferrer i Castellbò (Catalonia). El Balcó del Pirineu was urbanised in 1975 on a mountain range next to the river Segre, near of Montferrer and Castellciutat villages, in the same mountain range.

Alt Urgell